Forrest Ann Molinari (born September 4, 1995) is an American freestyle wrestler. She won one of the bronze medals in the women's 65 kg event at the 2021 World Wrestling Championships held in Oslo, Norway. She is a three-time medalist, including two gold medals, at the Pan American Wrestling Championships.

Career 

She competed in the women's 67 kg event at the 2015 World Junior Wrestling Championships held in Salvador da Bahia, Brazil. At the 2017 Pan American Wrestling Championships held in Lauro de Freitas, Brazil, she won one of the bronze medals in the women's 69 kg event.

She competed in the women's freestyle event of the Wrestling World Cup in 2017, 2018 and 2019. In 2018, she lost her bronze medal match in the women's 65 kg event at the Klippan Lady Open in Klippan, Sweden. A few months later, she won the gold medal in this event at the 2018 Pan American Wrestling Championships held in Lima, Peru. She lost her bronze medal match in both the women's 65 kg event at the 2018 World Wrestling Championships held in Budapest, Hungary and in the same event at the 2019 World Wrestling Championships held in Nur-Sultan, Kazakhstan. In 2019, she defeated Maya Nelson in the women's 65 kg event at the Final X: Rutgers event held in Piscataway, New Jersey, United States. A month later, she won the gold medal in the women's 65 kg event at the 2019 Yasar Dogu Tournament held in Istanbul, Turkey.

In 2020, at the Golden Grand Prix Ivan Yarygin held in Krasnoyarsk, Russia, she won one of the bronze medals in the women's 68 kg event.

In January 2021, she won the silver medal in the women's 68 kg event at the Grand Prix de France Henri Deglane held in Nice, France. In June 2021, she won one of the bronze medals in the women's 68 kg event at the 2021 Poland Open held in Warsaw, Poland. A few months later, she won one of the bronze medals in the women's 65 kg event at the World Wrestling Championships held in Oslo, Norway. She defeated Maryia Mamashuk of Belarus in her bronze medal match.

In January 2022, she won the silver medal in the women's 65 kg event at the Golden Grand Prix Ivan Yarygin held in Krasnoyarsk, Russia. In February 2022, she won the gold medal in the women's 65 kg event at the Yasar Dogu Tournament held in Istanbul, Turkey. She won the gold medal in her event at the 2022 Pan American Wrestling Championships held in Acapulco, Mexico.

She won one of the bronze medals in the women's 68kg event at the Grand Prix de France Henri Deglane 2023 held in Nice, France. She won the gold medal in her event at the 2023 Ibrahim Moustafa Tournament held in Alexandria, Egypt.

Achievements

References

External links 

 

Living people
1995 births
Place of birth missing (living people)
American female sport wrestlers
World Wrestling Championships medalists
Pan American Wrestling Championships medalists
21st-century American women